Five Island Park is an unincorporated community in Kane County, Illinois, United States. It is mostly a neighborhood east of Randall Road and on the Fox River. The actual neighborhood itself is located on LaFox Street. Five Island Park has a latitude of 41.972 degrees and a longitude of -88.31 degrees.

References

Unincorporated communities in Kane County, Illinois
Unincorporated communities in Illinois